This list shows the IUCN Red List status of the 112 mammal species occurring in Poland which have been recorded in historic times. Of these, two are endangered, three are vulnerable, and five are near threatened. Three of the species listed for Poland are nationally extinct.
The following tags are used to highlight each species' status as published by the International Union for Conservation of Nature:

Order: Rodentia (rodents) 

Rodents make up the largest order of mammals, with over 40% of mammalian species. They have two incisors in the upper and lower jaw which grow continually and must be kept short by gnawing.
Suborder: Sciurognathi
Family: Castoridae (beavers)
Genus: Castor
 American beaver, C. canadensis  introduced
Eurasian beaver, C. fiber 
Family: Sciuridae (squirrels)
Subfamily: Sciurinae
Tribe: Sciurini
Genus: Sciurus
Red squirrel, S. vulgaris 
Subfamily: Xerinae
Tribe: Marmotini
Genus: Marmota
 Alpine marmot, M. marmota 
Genus: Spermophilus
 European ground squirrel, Spermophilus citellus VU
 Speckled ground squirrel, Spermophilus suslicus VU
Family: Gliridae (dormice)
Subfamily: Leithiinae
Genus: Dryomys
 Forest dormouse, Dryomys nitedula LC
Genus: Eliomys
Garden dormouse, E. quercinus 
Genus: Muscardinus
 Hazel dormouse, Muscardinus avellanarius
Subfamily: Glirinae
Genus: Glis
 European edible dormouse, Glis glis LC
Family: Dipodidae (jerboas)
Subfamily: Sicistinae
Genus: Sicista
 Northern birch mouse, Sicista betulina LC
 Southern birch mouse, Sicista subtilis LC
Family: Cricetidae
Subfamily: Cricetinae
Genus: Cricetus
European hamster, C. cricetus 
Subfamily: Arvicolinae
Genus: Ondatra
 Muskrat, Ondatra zibethicus  introduced
Genus: Arvicola
European water vole, A. amphibius 
Genus: Chionomys
 Snow vole, Chionomys nivalis LC
Genus: Clethrionomys
 Bank vole, Myodes glareolus LC
Genus: Microtus
 Field vole, Microtus agrestis LC
 Common vole, Microtus arvalis LC
 Tundra vole, Microtus oeconomus LC
 European pine vole, Microtus subterraneus LC
 Tatra vole, Microtus tatricus NT
Family: Muridae (mice, rats, voles, gerbils, hamsters, etc.)
Subfamily: Murinae
Genus: Apodemus
 Striped field mouse, Apodemus agrarius LC
 Yellow-necked mouse, Apodemus flavicollis LC
 Wood mouse, Apodemus sylvaticus LC
 Ural field mouse, Apodemus uralensis LC
Genus: Micromys
 Eurasian harvest mouse, Micromys minutus LC
Genus: Mus
House mouse, M. musculus 
Genus: Rattus
Black rat, R. rattus 
 Brown rat, R. norvegicus

Order: Lagomorpha (lagomorphs) 

The lagomorphs comprise two families, Leporidae (hares and rabbits), and Ochotonidae (pikas). Though they can resemble rodents, and were classified as a superfamily in that order until the early twentieth century, they have since been considered a separate order. They differ from rodents in a number of physical characteristics, such as having four incisors in the upper jaw rather than two.

Family: Leporidae (rabbits, hares)
Genus: Lepus
European hare, L. europaeus 
Mountain hare, L. timidus 
Genus: Oryctolagus
European rabbit, O. cuniculus  introduced

Order: Erinaceomorpha (hedgehogs and gymnures) 

The order Erinaceomorpha contains a single family, Erinaceidae, which comprise the hedgehogs and gymnures. The hedgehogs are easily recognised by their spines while gymnures look more like large rats.

Family: Erinaceidae (hedgehogs)
Subfamily: Erinaceinae
Genus: Erinaceus
 West European hedgehog, E. europaeus 
 Northern white-breasted hedgehog, E. roumanicus

Order: Soricomorpha (shrews, moles, and solenodons) 

The "shrew-forms" are insectivorous mammals. The shrews and solenodons closely resemble mice while the moles are stout-bodied burrowers.

Family: Soricidae (shrews)
Subfamily: Crocidurinae
Genus: Crocidura
 Bicolored shrew, C. leucodon 
Lesser white-toothed shrew, C. suaveolens 
Subfamily: Soricinae
Tribe: Nectogalini
Genus: Neomys
 Southern water shrew, N. anomalus 
 Eurasian water shrew, N. fodiens 
Tribe: Soricini
Genus: Sorex
 Alpine shrew, S. alpinus 
 Common shrew, S. araneus 
 Laxmann's shrew, S. caecutiens 
 Eurasian pygmy shrew, S. minutus 
Family: Talpidae (moles)
Subfamily: Talpinae
Tribe: Talpini
Genus: Talpa
 European mole, T. europaea

Order: Chiroptera (bats) 

The bats' most distinguishing feature is that their forelimbs are developed as wings, making them the only mammals capable of flight. Bat species account for about 20% of all mammals.
Family: Vespertilionidae
Subfamily: Myotinae
Genus: Myotis
 Bechstein's bat, M. bechsteini 
 Lesser mouse-eared bat, M. blythii 
 Brandt's bat, M. brandti 
 Pond bat, M. dasycneme 
 Daubenton's bat, M. daubentonii 
Geoffroy's bat, M. emarginatus 
 Greater mouse-eared bat, M. myotis 
Whiskered bat, M. mystacinus 
Natterer's bat, M. nattereri 
Subfamily: Vespertilioninae
Genus: Barbastella
Western barbastelle, B. barbastellus 
Genus: Eptesicus
 Northern bat, E. nilssonii 
 Serotine bat, E. serotinus 
Genus: Nyctalus
 Greater noctule bat, N. lasiopterus 
 Lesser noctule, N. leisleri 
 Common noctule, N. noctula 
Genus: Pipistrellus
 Kuhl's pipistrelle, P. kuhlii 
 Nathusius' pipistrelle, P. nathusii 
 Common pipistrelle, P. pipistrellus 
 Soprano pipistrelle, P. pygmaeus 
Genus: Plecotus
Brown long-eared bat, P. auritus 
 Grey long-eared bat, P. austriacus 
Genus: Vespertilio
 Parti-coloured bat, V. murinus 
Family: Rhinolophidae
Subfamily: Rhinolophinae
Genus: Rhinolophus
Greater horseshoe bat, R. ferrumequinum 
Lesser horseshoe bat, R. hipposideros

Order: Cetacea (whales) 

The order Cetacea includes whales, dolphins and porpoises. They are the mammals most fully adapted to aquatic life with a spindle-shaped nearly hairless body, protected by a thick layer of blubber, and forelimbs and tail modified to provide propulsion underwater.
Suborder: Mysticeti
Family: Balaenopteridae
Subfamily: Balaenopterinae
Genus: Balaenoptera
 Common minke whale, B. acutorostrata 
 Sei whale, B. borealis 
 Fin whale, B. physalus 
Subfamily: Megapterinae
Genus: Megaptera
 Humpback whale, M. novaeangliae 
Suborder: Odontoceti
Family: Phocoenidae
Genus: Phocoena
 Harbour porpoise, Phocoena phocoena 
Family: Monodontidae
Genus: Delphinapterus
 Beluga, Delphinapterus leucas 
Family: Ziphidae
Genus: Hyperoodon
 Northern bottlenose whale, Hyperoodon ampullatus 
Genus: Mesoplodon
 Sowerby's beaked whale, Mesoplodon bidens 
Family: Delphinidae (marine dolphins)
Genus: Delphinus
 Short-beaked common dolphin, Delphinus delphis 
Genus: Lagenorhynchus
 White-beaked dolphin, Lagenorhynchus albirostris 
Genus: Tursiops
 Bottlenose dolphin, 
Genus: Orcinus
 Orca, O. orca

Order: Carnivora (carnivorans) 

There are over 260 species of carnivorans, the majority of which feed primarily on meat. They have a characteristic skull shape and dentition. 
Suborder: Feliformia
Family: Felidae (cats)
Subfamily: Felinae
Genus: Felis
 European wildcat, F. silvestris 
Genus: Lynx
 Eurasian lynx, L. lynx 
Suborder: Caniformia
Family: Canidae (dogs, foxes)
Genus: Canis
 Golden jackal, C. aureus , vagrant
European jackal, C. a. moreoticus
 Gray wolf, C. lupus 
Genus: Nyctereutes
 Raccoon dog, N. procyonoides  introduced
Genus: Vulpes
Red fox, V. vulpes 
Family: Procyonidae (raccoons)
Genus: Procyon
 Raccoon, P. lotor  introduced
Family: Ursidae (bears)
Genus: Ursus
 Brown bear, U. arctos 
Eurasian brown bear, U. a. arctos 
Family: Mustelidae (mustelids)
Genus: Lutra
Eurasian otter, L. lutra 
Genus: Martes
Beech marten, M. foina 
European pine marten, M. martes 
Genus: Meles
 European badger, M. meles 
Genus: Mustela
Stoat, M. erminea 
Steppe polecat, M. eversmannii 
Least weasel, M. nivalis 
European polecat, M. putorius 
Genus: Neovison
 American mink, N. vison  introduced
Family: Phocidae (earless seals)
Genus: Halichoerus
 Grey seal, H. grypus 
Genus: Phoca
 Common seal, P. vitulina 
Genus: Pusa
 Ringed seal, P. hispida

Order: Artiodactyla (even-toed ungulates) 

The even-toed ungulates are ungulates whose weight is borne about equally by the third and fourth toes, rather than mostly or entirely by the third as in perissodactyls. There are about 220 artiodactyl species, including many that are of great economic importance to humans.
Family: Suidae (pigs)
Subfamily: Suinae
Genus: Sus
Wild boar, S. scrofa 
Family: Cervidae (deer)
Subfamily: Capreolinae
Genus: Alces
Moose, A. alces  
Genus: Capreolus
 Roe deer, C. capreolus 
Subfamily: Cervinae
Genus: Cervus
Red deer, C. elaphus 
 Sika deer, C. nippon  introduced
Genus: Dama
 European fallow deer, D. dama  introduced
Family: Bovidae (cattle, antelope, sheep, goats)
Subfamily: Bovinae
Genus: Bison
European bison, B. bonasus  reintroduced
Genus: Bos
 Aurochs, B. primigenius 
Subfamily: Caprinae
Genus: Rupicapra
Chamois, R. rupicapra

Locally extinct 
The following species are locally extinct in the country:
European mink, Mustela lutreola

See also
List of chordate orders
List of prehistoric mammals
Lists of mammals by region
Mammal classification
List of mammals described in the 2000s

References

Further reading 
Baraniak E., Kubasik W., Pałka K. 1998. Smużka stepowa Sicista subtilis (Pallas, 1773) (Rodentia: Zapodidae) – nowy gatunek ssaka w faunie Polski. Przegląd Zoologiczny 42 (2): 241–243.
Bogdanowicz W., Ruprecht A. L. 1987 Przypadki stwierdzeń szopa pracza Procoyon lotor (Linnaeus, 1758) w Polsce. Przegląd Zoologiczny 31 (3): 375-383
Carleton M., Musser G., Pavlinov I. 2003. Myodes Pallas, 1811, is the valid name for the genus of red-backed voles. W: A. O. Averianov, N. I. Abramson (red.) Systematics, Phylogeny and Paleontology of Small Mammals. An International Conference Devoted to the 90th Anniversary of Prof. I. M. Gromov. Proceedings of the Zoological Institute, Saint Petersburg: 96–98.
Mitchell-Jones A. J., Amori G., Bogdanowicz W., Kryštufek B., Reinjders P. J. H., Spitzenberger F., Stubbe M., Thissen J. B. M., Vohralik V., Zima J. 1999. The Atlas of European Mammals. Academic Press, London.
Niermann I., Biedermann M., Bogdanowicz W., Brinkmann R., Le Bris Y., Ciechanowski M., Dietz C., Dietz I., Estók P., Helversen O. v., Le Houédec A., Paksuz S., Petrov B. P., Özkan B., Piksa K., Rachwald A., Roué S. Y., Sachanowicz K., Schorcht W., Tereba A., Mayer F. 2007. Biogeography of the recently described Myotis alcathoe von Helversen and Heller, 2001. Acta Chiropterologica 9: 361–378.
Pucek Z. 1981. Key to vertebrates of Poland. Mammals. Polish Scientific Publishers, Warszawa.
Sachanowicz, K., Ciechanowski M., Piksa K. 2006. Distribution patterns, species richness and status of bats in Poland. Vespertilio 9-10: 151–173. http://www.ceson.org/vespertilio/9_10/Sachanowicz.pdf

External links
Atlas Ssaków Polski 

Poland
Mammals
Mammals
Poland